Saints Protus and Hyacinth were Christian martyrs during the persecution of Emperor Valerian (257–259 AD). Protus' name is sometimes spelled Protatius, Proteus, Prothus, Prote, and Proto. His name was corrupted in England as Saint Pratt.

The day of their annual commemoration is mentioned in the "Depositio Martyrum" on September 11, in the chronographia for the year 354. The chronographia also mentions their graves, in the Coemeterium of Basilla on the Via Salaria, later the Catacomb of St. Hermes. The "Itineraries" and other early authorities likewise give this as their place of burial.

Tradition

Tradition holds that Protus and Hyacinth were brothers. They served as chamberlains to Saint Eugenia, and were baptized along with her by Helenus, Bishop of Heliopolis. Devoting themselves zealously to the study of sacred scripture, they lived with the hermits of Egypt and later accompanied Eugenia to Rome.  There, they were arrested for their Christianity by Emperor Gallienus (260–268).  Refusing to deny their faith, they were first scourged and then beheaded on September 11.

The Graves of Sts. Protus and Hyacinth
In 1845, Father Marchi discovered the still undisturbed grave of St. Hyacinth in a crypt of the above-mentioned catacomb. It was a small square niche in which lay the ashes and pieces of burned bone wrapped in the remains of costly stuffs. Evidently the saint had been burnt; most martyrs had suffered death by fire. The niche was closed by a marble slab similar to that used to close a loculus, and bearing the original Latin inscription that confirmed the date in the old Roman Martyrology:

D P III IDUS SEPTEBR

YACINTHUS

MARTYR 

(Buried on 11 September Hyacinthus Martyr).

In the same chamber were found fragments of an architrave belonging to some later decoration, with the words:

. . . S E P U L C R U M P R O T I M(artyris) . . .

(Grave of the Martyr Protus)

Thus, both martyrs were buried in the same crypt. Pope Damasus I wrote an epitaph in honor of the two martyrs, part of which still exists. In the epitaph, Pope Damasus calls Protus and Hyacinth "brothers." When Pope Leo IV (847–855) transferred the bones of many Roman martyrs to the churches of Rome, the relics of these two saints were to be translated also; but, probably on account of the devastation of the burial chamber, only the grave of St. Protus was found. His bones were transferred to San Salvatore on the Palatine Hill. The remains of St Hyacinth were placed (June 1933) in the chapel of the Propaganda College. Later, the tombs of the two saints and a stairway built at the end of the fourth century were discovered and restored.

Cult in England
St Protus and St Hyacinth's Church, Blisland in Cornwall was dedicated to Saint Protus. It is known locally as St Pratts.

Notes

References

External links

 "SS. Protus and Hyacinthus, Martyrs", Butler's Lives of the Saints
Catholic Encyclopedia: Sts. Protus and Hyacinth
Catholic Culture: Sts. Protus and Hyacinth
 About Blisland in North Cornwall (refers to a church dedicated to these two saints)
Santi Proto e Giacinto di Roma 

3rd-century births
250s deaths
3rd-century Christian martyrs
Saints from Roman Egypt
Sibling duos